Sven Andersson may refer to:

Sven Andersson (farmworker) (1668–1691)
Sven Andersson (footballer, born 1907) (1907–1981), Swedish footballer
Sven Andersson (footballer, born 1945), Swedish footballer
Sven Andersson (footballer, born 1963), Swedish footballer
Sven Andersson (ice hockey) (born 1932), Swedish ice hockey player
Sven Andersson (politician) (1910–1987), Swedish politician
Sven Andersson (motorcycle racer), Swedish motorcycle racer
Sven Andersson (speed skater) (1921–2016), Swedish speed skater
Sven Andersson i Billingsfors, Swedish politician
Sven Andersson i Sveneby, Swedish politician